Žbogar is a Slovene surname. Notable people with the surname include:

Robert Žbogar (born 1989), Slovenian swimmer
Samuel Žbogar (born 1962), Slovenian diplomat
Vasilij Žbogar (born 1975), Slovenian sailor

Slovene-language surnames